Yuzhai is a town in Linquan County of Fuyang, Anhui, China.

References

Towns in Anhui